The M3 Chertsey Bridge is a motorway bridge in England built in the 1970s.

Purpose
The bridge carries a minimum of medium-distance traffic along the M3 motorway between its first and second junctions across the River Thames at its north–south reach above Chertsey Lock, Surrey.

The bridge is 300 metres upstream of the lock and 450 metres upstream of taller Chertsey Bridge, the short-distance traffic bridge of Chertsey across the river, which is a stone-built listed structure — restored and strengthened in the early 21st century, humped and subject to an 18-ton LGV use restriction.  It was erected in 1785, replacing an earlier bridge on the site.

It is one of three bridges carrying motorways across the Thames, the others being the M25 Runnymede Bridge and the M4 Thames Bridge, Maidenhead.

See also
 Crossings of the River Thames

References

Bridges across the River Thames
Bridges in Surrey